Sodium bismuthate is an inorganic compound, and a strong oxidiser with chemical formula NaBiO3. It is somewhat hygroscopic, but not soluble in cold water, which can be convenient since the reagent can be easily removed after the reaction. It is one of the few water insoluble sodium salts. Commercial samples may be a mixture of bismuth(V) oxide, sodium carbonate and sodium peroxide.

A related compound with the approximate formula Na3BiO4 also exists.

Structure
Sodium bismuthate adopts an ilmenite structure, consisting of octahedral bismuth(V) centers and sodium cations. The average Bi–O distance is 2.116 Å. The ilmenite structure is related to the corundum structure (Al2O3) with a layer structure formed by close packed oxygen atoms with the two different cations alternating in octahedral sites.

Synthesis
Bismuth oxidizes to the +V oxidation state only with difficulty in the absence of alkali. Synthesis is performed by making a suspension of bismuth trioxide in a boiling sodium hydroxide solution. It is then oxidized by addition of bromine to form sodium bismuthate.

Bi2O3 + 6 NaOH + 2 Br2 → 2 NaBiO3 + 4 NaBr + 3 H2O  

Another synthesis of NaBiO3 involves oxidizing a mixture of sodium oxide and bismuth(III) oxide with air (as the source of O2):
Na2O + Bi2O3 + O2 → 2 NaBiO3
The procedure is analogous to the oxidation of manganese dioxide in alkali to give sodium manganate.

Reactions
Storage conditions with moisture and high temperatures are detrimental to sodium bismuthate, as it oxidizes water, decomposing into sodium hydroxide and bismuth(III) oxide:
2 NaBiO3 + H2O → 2 NaOH + Bi2O3 + O2
It is decomposed faster by acids. In HCl, NaBiO3 also reacts to form chlorine gas.

NaBiO3 may be used to detect manganese qualitatively and quantitatively. As a strong oxidizer, it converts almost any manganese compound to permanganate, which is easily assayed spectrophotometrically. To do this, some NaBiO3 and the sample are reacted in a hot solution of sulfuric acid or nitric acid. Permanganate has a violet color and maximum absorbance at 510 nm. The reaction is:
2 Mn2+ + 5 NaBiO3 + 14 H+ → 2  + 5 Bi3+ + 5 Na+ + 7 H2O

Sodium bismuthate can perform oxidative 1,2-cleavage on glycols, ketols and alpha hydroxy acids with no further oxidation of the (possible) aldehyde products:
R2C(OH)–C(OH)–R2 → R2C=O + O=CR2
R2C(OH)–C(O)–R → R2C=O + RCOOH
R2C(OH)–COOH → R2C=O + CO2

These cleavages can be done in the presence of acetic or phosphoric acid at room temperature. Alcohols like methanol or ethanol can be used as the reaction media, as they are oxidized slowly with sodium bismuthate. Lead tetraacetate performs similar reactions, but anhydrous conditions, as required in the use of lead tetraacetate, are not necessary for sodium bismuthate.

NaBiO3 can be used for lab-scale plutonium separation (see bismuth phosphate process).

Safety
NaBiO3 is a mild mechanical irritant. Upon ingestion it is moderately toxic with symptoms akin to lead poisoning: abdominal pain and vomiting. Large doses cause diarrhea and death. Continued absorption of NaBiO3 into body causes permanent kidney damage. These effects are due to the toxicity of bismuth. Oral absolute lethal dose (LD100) of NaBiO3 is 720 mg/kg for rats, and 510 mg/kg for rabbits.

References

Citations

Sodium compounds
Bismuth compounds
Oxygen compounds